The West Indies cricket team, captained by Clive Lloyd, toured India, Sri Lanka and Pakistan from November 1974 to March 1975 and played a five-match Test series against the India national cricket team followed by a two-match series against the Pakistan national cricket team. West Indies won the series in India 3–2 and the series in Pakistan was drawn 0–0. In Sri Lanka, the West Indians played two internationals against the Sri Lanka national cricket team which had not then achieved Test status; therefore, the internationals played at the Colombo Cricket Club Ground and the Paikiasothy Saravanamuttu Stadium, both in Colombo, are classified as first-class matches. India were captained by Mansoor Ali Khan Pataudi, Pakistan by Intikhab Alam and Sri Lanka by Anura Tennekoon.

Test series summary

India

First Test

Second Test

Third Test

Fourth Test

Fifth Test

Pakistan

First Test

Second Test

References

External links

1974 in Indian cricket
1974 in West Indian cricket
1975 in Indian cricket
1975 in Pakistani cricket
1975 in Sri Lankan cricket
1975 in West Indian cricket
Indian cricket seasons from 1970–71 to 1999–2000
International cricket competitions from 1970–71 to 1975
Pakistani cricket seasons from 1970–71 to 1999–2000
Sri Lankan cricket seasons from 1972–73 to 1999–2000
1974-75
1975
1975